Zdenko is a male given name of Slovak, Slovene or Croatian origin. It is the Slavic version of the name Sidonius (meaning of Sidon). Other explanation are given as coming from the slavic term zidati, meaning to build or to create or zdenac meaning a well. It is also seen as a diminutive of the given name Zdeslav or Zdenek.

People with this name
Zdenko Babić, Croatian basketball player
Zdenko Baotić, Bosnian footballer
Zdenko Fibich or Zdeněk Fibich, Czech composer
Zdenko Hans Skraup, Czech Austrian chemist
Zdenko Kobešćak, Croatian footballer
Zdenko Kolar, Serbian bass guitarist
Zdenko Kožul, Croatian chess grandmaster
Zdenko Seselja, Australian politician
Zdenko Runjić, Croatian songwriter
Zdenko Strba or Zdeno Štrba, Slovak footballer
Zdenko Trebuľa, President of the Košice Self-governing Region since 2006
Zdenko Verdenik, Slovenian football manager
Zdenko Zorko, Croatian Olympic handball player

See also
 Zdenka
Zdeněk
 Slavic names

References

Czech masculine given names
Slovak masculine given names
Croatian masculine given names
Slavic masculine given names